Michal Šilhavý (born 29 May 1976) is a Czech retired football player and coach.

Vietnam

Moving to Thể Công of the V.League 1 through his Hungarian mentor at Budapest Honvéd, Silhavy was surprised at the penurious state of locals there and did not settle in well in his first few months, despite earning a salary higher than what he had in the Czech lower leagues. One of five foreign imports, the Czech goalkeeper mixed with two Brazilians, a Hungarian and a Cameroonian, helping The Cong get 14 points from their first seven rounds. He then switched to HAGL in 2009 making a penalty save to spearhead HAGL to the 2010 Vietnamese Cup final which they lost.

On the level of the Vietnamese league, Silhavy commented that it was very technical and focused on attack.

References

External links 
 Idnes.cz Profile

1976 births
Living people
Czech footballers
FK Viktoria Žižkov players
FC Dolní Benešov players
FK Mladá Boleslav players
1. FK Příbram players
SK Sparta Krč players
FC Viktoria Plzeň players
FC Slovan Liberec players
FK Baník Most players
Budapest Honvéd FC players
Viettel FC players
Song Lam Nghe An FC players
Hoang Anh Gia Lai FC players
V.League 1 players
FK Kunice players
Association football goalkeepers
Czech expatriate footballers
Czech expatriate sportspeople in Vietnam
Expatriate footballers in Vietnam